The following is a list of men's ice hockey champions of the Big Ten Conference, including champions of the conference's playoff tournament.

Championships by season

Championships by school

References
https://web.archive.org/web/20140413125204/http://www.bigten.org/sports/m-hockey/
http://grfx.cstv.com/photos/schools/msu/sports/m-hockey/auto_pdf/2013-14/misc_non_event/section-6-mg.pdf#page=20
http://grfx.cstv.com/photos/schools/wis/sports/m-hockey/auto_pdf/2013-14/misc_non_event/2013_14MensHockeyFactBook.pdf#page=195

Big Ten Conference ice hockey